The 2018 Ulster Senior Club Football Championship was the 51st instalment of the annual competition organised by Ulster GAA. It was one of the four provincial competitions of the 2018–19 All-Ireland Senior Club Football Championship.

Derry's Slaughtneil were the 2017 champions, but defeat in the Derry quarter-final meant they couldn't defend their title.

Donegal champions Gaoth Dobhair became Ulster champions for the first time after beating Monaghan's Scotstown in the final.

Teams
The Ulster championship is contested by the winners of the nine county championships in the Irish province of Ulster. Ulster comprises the six counties of Northern Ireland, as well as Cavan, Donegal and Monaghan in the Republic of Ireland.

Bracket

Preliminary round

Quarter-finals

Semi-finals

Final

Championship statistics

Top scorers
Overall

In a single game

References

Ulster Senior Club Championship
Ulster Senior Club Football Championship
2018 in Northern Ireland sport
Ulster Club SFC